The Deputy Chief Minister of Telangana is the deputy to the Chief Minister of Telangana, who is head of the government of Telangana. The deputy chief minister is the second highest ranking member of the Telangana Council of Ministers. A deputy chief minister also holds a cabinet portfolio in the state ministry. In the legislative assembly system of government, the chief minister is treated as the "first among equals" in the cabinet; the position of deputy chief minister is used to govern the state with the support of a single party member or to bring political stability and strength within a coalition government, or in times of state emergency, when a proper chain of command is necessary. On multiple occasions, proposals have arisen to make the post permanent, but without result. The same goes for the post of deputy prime minister at the national level.

The first deputy chief minister of Telangana was M. Mohamood Ali, who was also Minister of Revenue, Relief & Rehabilitation, ULC, Stamps & Registration in Chandrashekar Rao's first ministry. The second deputy chief minister was T. Rajaiah, who took on the role in addition to his health ministership in K. Chandrashekar Rao's government. On 25 January 2015, the chief minister K. Chandrashekar Rao dismissed Rajaiah in the wake of serious charges of corruption in his department and soon that day position of Rajaiah was replaced by Kadiyam Srihari and he became the third deputy chief minister of the state.

The current government does not have a deputy chief minister and the post has been vacant since 13 December 2018.

List

Statistics
List of deputy chief ministers by length of term

Timeline

List by party

Parties by total duration (in days) of holding Deputy Chief Minister's Office

See also
 History of Telangana
 Elections in Telangana
 List of governors of Telangana
 Chief Secretariat of Telangana
 Telangana Legislative Assembly
 List of chief ministers of Telangana
 List of chief ministers of Andhra Pradesh
 List of current Indian deputy chief ministers
 List of deputy chief ministers of Andhra Pradesh

Notes

References

Deputy chief ministers of Telangana
Telangana-related lists
Telangana